Ernest of Brunswick-Lüneburg may refer to:

 Ernest I, Duke of Brunswick-Lüneburg (1497–1546), also called Ernest the Confessor
 Ernest II, Duke of Brunswick-Lüneburg (1564–1611)
 Ernest I, Duke of Brunswick-Grubenhagen (c.  1297–1361)
 Ernest II, Duke of Brunswick-Grubenhagen (1418–1466)
 Ernest III, Duke of Brunswick-Grubenhagen (1518–1567)
 Ernest I, Duke of Brunswick-Göttingen (c. 1305–1367)
 Ernest Ferdinand, Duke of Brunswick-Lüneburg (1682–1746)
 Ernest Augustus, Elector of Brunswick-Lüneburg (1629–1698) 
 Ernest Augustus, Duke of Brunswick (1887–1953)
 Duke Louis Ernest of Brunswick-Lüneburg (1718–1788)